The Toyota Corolla (E210) is the twelfth generation of the Corolla, a compact car (C-segment) manufactured by Toyota. Introduced in 2018, this generation has also grown to include hatchback and estate (station wagon) configurations in addition to the saloon (sedan).

Since 2022, a high-performance model became available as the GR Corolla. Based on the hatchback model, the GR Corolla is marketed under the Gazoo Racing family of high-performance cars.

Overview 
The E210 series Corolla was first introduced in 2018 at the Geneva Motor Show. The E210 Corolla is paired with a transverse engine powered by petrol, flex-fuel, or a hybrid of petrol and electric. Developed under the lead of chief engineer Yasushi Ueda, it is the first generation of the Corolla to be built on the Toyota New Global Architecture (GA-C) platform shared with the fourth-generation Prius and C-HR.

, the twelfth-generation Corolla was the best-selling passenger vehicle in the world with a 1.6% global market share.

Body styles

Hatchback 

The twelfth generation Corolla Hatchback was unveiled as a pre-production model in early March 2018 at the 88th Geneva Motor Show and as a production model on 28 March 2018 at the New York International Auto Show in hatchback body style.

The vehicle was initially branded as the Auris, a nameplate Toyota used historically for Corolla hatchbacks, but had subsequently been phased out. The Auris nameplate was discontinued across Europe in January 2019 and in Taiwan in July 2020. In Japan and in Taiwan (since July 2020), the hatchback is marketed as the Corolla Sport; in other regions it is simply called the Corolla hatchback.

Depending on the country, power for the Corolla hatchback comes from the 1.2-litre 8NR-FTS turbocharged petrol, the 1.8-litre 2ZR-FXE hybrid petrol, the 2.0-litre M20A-FKS Dynamic Force petrol or the 2.0-litre M20A-FXS Dynamic Force hybrid petrol engine.

The Corolla Hatchback is produced in the Tsutsumi Plant in Toyota, Aichi, Japan, and in Toyota Manufacturing UK in Burnaston, United Kingdom for the European market.

Saloon 
The saloon model was unveiled simultaneously between 15 and 16 November 2018 in Carmel-by-the-Sea, California, United States, and in China at the 2018 Guangzhou International Motor Show. This is sold in two versions which are referred to internally as Prestige and Sporty.

Prestige 

The "Prestige" model is sold in China, Taiwan, Europe, Middle East, Africa, South America and Southeast Asia. This uses a different front fascia, which is more similar to the XV70 series Camry, conceived based on a research that customers in these markets prefer a more "prestigious" look for the saloon. The first "Prestige" model saloon rolled off the assembly line at the Sakarya plant in Turkey on 28 January 2019. The "Prestige" model was launched in Turkey on 13 February 2019 and sales began the following day.

The "Prestige" model has been available in certain European countries since March 2019. While there are several engine choices for the Hatchback and Touring Sports, the sole powertrain for the European Corolla saloon is the 1.8-litre hybrid paired with CVT.

In Taiwan and Southeast Asia, the "Prestige" model saloon is sold as the Corolla Altis. In Morocco, it is marketed as the Corolla Prestige. It was launched in Taiwan on 27 March 2019, in Thailand on 3 September 2019, in the Philippines on 9 September 2019, in Indonesia on 12 September 2019, in Malaysia on 9 October 2019, in Brunei on 2 January 2020 and in Singapore on 9 January 2020 at the Singapore Motorshow.

Sporty 

The "Sporty" model uses a similar front fascia to the hatchback and estate versions. This version is sold in North America, Japan, Australia, South Africa, China (as the Levin) and other countries.

The "Sporty" model was launched in Japan on 17 September 2019 with a smaller footprint than its international counterpart.

Depending on the countries, power for the Corolla saloon (E210) comes from a choice of the 1.2-litre 8NR-FTS turbo petrol, 1.8-litre petrol 2ZR-FE, 1.8-litre 2XR-FXE hybrid petrol, or 2.0-litre petrol M20A-FKS.

Estate 

The estate or station wagon variation of the Corolla was unveiled at the 2018 Paris Motor Show. The vehicle is branded as the Corolla Touring Sports in most markets, and the Corolla Touring in Japan. The vehicle is not available in the North American, Australian and Asian (except for Japan) markets including the Chinese market. All components and other elements of the Corolla Touring Sports behind the B-pillar were completely developed in Europe as it is the primary market for the model.

Depending on the country, power for the Corolla Touring Sports comes from the 1.2-litre 8NR-FTS turbocharged petrol, the 1.8-litre 2ZR-FAE naturally aspirated petrol, the 1.8-litre 2ZR-FXE hybrid petrol, or the 2.0-litre M20A-FXS hybrid petrol engine.

Toyota introduced the Corolla Trek version of estate car at the 2019 Geneva Motor Show, with a raised suspension, a roof rack and additional body protection.

Estate models are produced in Toyota Manufacturing UK in Burnaston, United Kingdom for the European market, and in the Tsutsumi Plant in Toyota, Aichi, Japan for the smaller Japanese-market model.

Markets

Japan 
The Corolla hatchback is sold in Japan as the Corolla Sport, which was launched on 27 June 2018. It is sold exclusively at Toyota Corolla Store dealerships equipped with T-Connect available with the 2018 Crown. Motive power for the Japanese Corolla Sport comes from the 1.2-litre turbo petrol engine or 1.8-litre Hybrid engine. Trim levels are the base G"X", the mid-level G and the fully loaded G"Z". Intelligent manual transmission is only for the cars with smaller displacement engine. The 1.2-litre cars are also offered with Full-Time 4WD paired with CVT-i. The 2WD G"Z" can be ordered with Adaptive Variable Suspension (AVS) system and Drive Mode Select with Eco, Comfort, Normal, Sport S and Sport S+ modes.

Both the Corolla saloon and Corolla Touring were launched in Japan on 17 September 2019. They both share the same wheelbase as the Corolla hatchback (Sport in Japan), contrary to the global Corolla. The bonnet panel, door windows, rear windscreen, doors, bumpers, and the roof stamping had to be redesigned for the Japanese model. The angle of the door mirrors was readjusted to fold closer to the body in order to fit in a narrow garage or parking space. The Japanese market Touring uses the same front fascia as the "Sporty" saloon.

Trim levels for the Japanese market Corolla saloon and Touring are the base G-X, the mid-level S and the fully-loaded W×B. Powertrain options are the 1.8-litre petrol engine with CVT (for all trim levels), 1.8-litre Hybrid engine with either 2WD or E-Four (for all trim levels) and 1.2-litre turbo petrol engine with manual transmission (for W×B trim only).

In May 2020, the "2000 Limited" variant of the Touring was released. It is powered by the 2.0-litre M20A-FKS engine (the first 2.0-litre engine option for the Japanese market Corolla) paired with a CVT with ten-speed simulated gear, and had a limited production of 500 units. The "Active Ride" variant with the same engine and production units was released in April 2021.

North America 
The North American version of the hatchback was unveiled on 28 March 2018 at the New York International Auto Show for the 2019 model year. The hatchback is only offered in the "sporty" SE and XSE trim levels and is powered by the 2.0-litre M20A-FKS Dynamic Force straight-four engine (I4) paired with either a six-speed intelligent manual transmission (iMT) or the K120 Direct Shift continuously variable transmission (CVT). The Direct Shift CVT includes a physical first gear (known as a "launch gear") and nine additional simulated gears, for a total of ten. The launch gear is engaged when the car takes off from being stopped and transitions to the belt drive once the car picks up speed. The benefit of this system is that traditional CVTs tend to have low efficiency in lower gear ratios (creating a moment of sluggishness when starting from a stop). Since belts are handling a more narrow band of gear ratios, belt angles and loads can be reduced, increasing shift speeds and offering a 6% improvement in fuel efficiency.

The twelfth generation is the first version of the Corolla in the United States to offer a hybrid engine. It was unveiled at the November 2018 LA Auto Show. The hybrid Corolla drivetrain is mechanically almost identical to the Prius with a fuel economy figure of  matching the base model Prius.  Since the Corolla sells at higher volumes than the Prius, offering a hybrid helps the company meet corporate average fuel economy (CAFE) standards, and Toyota's market research showed that Hispanic customers preferred the Corolla to the Prius.

The saloon car went on sale in the United States on 26 February 2019 for the 2020 model year. L, LE and XLE grades are equipped with the 1.8 litre 2ZR-FAE I4 engine paired with the older K313 CVT, all carried over from the prior generation E170 Corolla in North America. The Hybrid LE model uses the 2ZR-FXE I4 engine (an Atkinson cycle variant of the 2ZR-FAE) paired with the Hybrid Synergy Drive eCVT. The "sporty" SE and XSE grades use the same powertrain as the hatchback, the 2.0-litre M20A-FKS “Dynamic Force” engine paired with either six-speed iMT (SE only) or the “Direct Shift” CVT.

The twelfth generation Corolla saloon came to the Mexican market on 7 May 2019 in Base (replacing L), LE, SE and Hybrid versions. In the Mexican and Canadian markets, the Base/L model is available with a six-speed manual transmission.

All Corolla trim levels feature power windows and door locks, LED front headlamps and LED rear lamps, the Toyota STAR Safety System, a 4.2-inch multi-information display in the gauge cluster, and the Entune 3.0 touchscreen infotainment system with Apple CarPlay and Amazon Alexa integration (Android Auto was added for the 2021 model year). All US and Canadian market Corollas are also equipped with the Toyota Safety Sense 2.0 collision avoidance and driver assistance system.

Upscale trim levels (XLE and XSE, not available in Mexico) add features like steering wheel-mounted paddle shifters for CVT transmission-equipped models, alloy wheels, SofTex (artificial leather) seats, and an upgraded 7-inch multi-information instrument cluster display.

In September 2020, Toyota released the limited edition Corolla Apex in the United States for the 2021 model year. Based on the SE or XSE saloon models, the Apex comes with stiffer and lowered springs, adjusted dampers, a bigger anti-roll bar, and 18-inch black alloy wheels. Front, side, and rear bumper spoilers are also standard. Toyota says it will only build 6,000 Corolla Apex units, of which only 120 will be equipped with six-speed manual transmission, all of them on the SE trim level.

On 1 June 2022, Toyota introduced a midcycle refresh of the North American Corolla. The refresh included minor exterior design revisions and major mechanical revisions; all 2023 model year non-hybrid Corollas offer the XSE's  four-cylinder engine and K120 CVT as standard; the 6-speed manual is discontinued.

Engine choices for the North American Corolla are:
 1.8 L, 2ZR-FAE straight four-cylinder (I4) engine, (Base/L, LE and XLE models, 6-speed manual (except US) or K313 CVT, 2019-2023)
 1.8 L, 2ZR-FXE straight four-cylinder (I4) engine with Hybrid Synergy Drive system, (Hybrid LE model, eCVT)
 2.0 L, M20A-FKS straight four-cylinder (I4) engine, (SE and XSE models, LE and XLE since 2023 model year; 6-speed manual (2019-2023 in US) or K120 CVT with physical first gear)
 1.8 L, 2ZR-FXE straight four-cylinder (I4) engine with Hybrid Synergy Drive system, (Hybrid LE/SE AWD, eCVT)

Saloon

Hatchback

Brazil 
The E210 Corolla saloon was launched in September 2019, and included an Altis trim with the first version of a flex-fuel hybrid powered by a 1.8-litre Atkinson engine. All the other trims, GLi, XEi and Altis, are powered by a 2.0-litre M20A-FKB flex-fuel engine. The Corolla is produced in the Indaiatuba, São Paulo plant, and initially only 5% of production was devoted to the Altis flex-fuel hybrid with the hybrid powertrain being imported from Japan. However, by February 2020, and despite of production constraints, sales of the Corolla Altis flex-fuel hybrid reached almost 25% sales of the country's entire Corolla line-up. In 2021, Toyota launched the GR-S version in the Brazilian market, with the same design as the Taiwanese Corolla Altis GR Sport, powered by the 2.0-litre M20A-FKB engine.

Taiwan 
The Auris for the Taiwan market was launched on 12 September 2018 and is fully imported from Japan. The Auris was renamed to Corolla Sport in July 2020.
 
The Corolla Altis for the Taiwan market was launched on 27 March 2019. Trim levels are offered in 1.8 and 1.8 Hybrid trim levels paired with CVT. The Corolla Altis Hybrid was also available for the first time in Taiwan. Both the Taiwan market Corolla Altis and Corolla Altis Hybrid were locally assembled.

On 29 April 2020, the Corolla Altis GR Sport made its debut in Taiwan, which was developed by Kuozui Motors.

China 
For the mainland China market, excluding Hong Kong and Macao, the E210 series Corolla saloon is available in two different styles. The "Prestige" Corolla is produced and sold by FAW Toyota, whereas the "Sporty" model called Levin is produced and sold by GAC Toyota. Both the Corolla and the Levin are offered as regular petrol, Hybrid and Plug-in Hybrid versions. Both were released in China on 8 August 2019.

The hybrid versions of Corolla and Levin are sold with additional "Shuāngqíng" name to differentiate from the petrol versions. The Levin with 1.2-litre 9NR-FTS petrol engine is named "185T", as it produces  of maximum torque.

The Corolla is offered in Pioneer, Elite, Deluxe, Sport, and Ultimate trim levels. Trim levels for the Levin are Progressive, Deluxe, Sports, Technology, and Premium. The Sports trim has the same front bumper design as the North American Corolla SE/XSE models, while the others have the same front bumper design as the regular "Sporty" Corolla.

Some versions come with a 12.1-inch portrait touchscreen infotainment system (e.g. Technology trim of the Levin) and other versions come with 9.0-inch touchscreen infotainment system with Baidu CarLife or WeLink. Leather interior and sunroof are exclusive for the Premium trim.

In November 2020, the long-wheelbase derivatives were revealed as the Allion (originally "傲澜"; the change was made because the latter name may sound offensive to Teochew dialect speakers) and the Levin GT. The Allion is based on the "Prestige" Corolla with several changes to the front fascia and manufactured by FAW Toyota, while the Levin GT is based on the "Sporty" Corolla and manufactured by GAC Toyota. It is an attempt to occupy a popular segment between the Corolla and the Camry, which is called "A+ class sedan" segment in China.

In January 2021, the 1.5-litre M15B-FKS and M15C-FKS engine options were added.

Available powertrain options include:
 1.2 L 9NR-FTS straight four-cylinder (I4) turbocharged petrol engine,  (regular models, with CVT)
 1.5 L M15B-FKS straight three-cylinder (I3) petrol engine
 1.5 L M15C-FKS straight three-cylinder (I3) petrol engine (Levin)
 1.8 L 8ZR-FXE straight four-cylinder (I4) petrol engine with Hybrid Synergy Drive system,  (hybrid models, with eCVT)
 2.0 L M20C-FKS straight four-cylinder (I4) petrol engine,  (Levin GT, with CVT)
 2.0 L M20E-FKS straight four-cylinder (I4) petrol engine,  (Allion, with CVT)

Europe 
The twelfth-generation Corolla hatchback for the European market is built in the UK and is powered by a 2.0-litre,  M20A-FXS hybrid drivetrain along with a 1.8-litre,  2ZR-FXE hybrid drivetrain. Standard petrol engines are also available, one of them would be a 1.2-litre turbocharged 8NR-FTS engine. However, diesel engines are not used. Production of the European market Corolla hatchback began on 14 January 2019. Sales began in the UK in February 2019 and across Europe in March 2019.

The Corolla hybrid in the European market was unveiled as a pre-production model at the 2018 Geneva Motor Show as the Auris hybrid, with the Auris name later discontinued. The production version of the European market Corolla hybrid in hatchback and estate (Touring Sports) variants were later revealed at the 2018 Paris Motor Show. Across Europe, the Corolla is sold in several trim levels with standard and optional equipment varying across the countries.

The E210 Corolla saloon marks the return of conventional 4-door body shape Corolla after the E120 generation was replaced by hatchback and estate-only Auris. While the 5-door Corolla Hatchback and Touring Sports are sold across Europe, the 4-door saloon is only offered in selected countries such as the UK, Ireland, Germany, Spain and Romania.

Suzuki Swace 

The Suzuki-badged version called Suzuki Swace was introduced in September 2020. It is based on the Corolla estate with 1.8-litre hybrid engine and sold in Europe only.

In February 2023, the Suzuki Swace received power and technology upgrades following the recent facelift of its twin, the Toyota Corolla Touring Sports.

United Kingdom 
In the UK, the Corolla Hatchback and Touring Sports are marketed as Icon, Icon Tech, Design and Excel. The top-of-the-line Excel is only sold with 1.8-litre 2ZR-FXE or 2.0-litre M20A-FXS hybrid engines.

The UK-only Corolla Commercial was updated in February 2023 with a fifth-generation hybrid powertrain and improved safety features.

Southeast Asia

Brunei 
In Brunei, the Corolla Altis saloon was launched in January 2020. It is fully imported from Thailand. The models include 1.6- and 1.8-litre petrol engines with 7-speed CVT transmissions.

Indonesia 
The Corolla Altis for the Indonesian market was launched on 12 September 2019 and is fully imported from Thailand. Initial trim levels were 1.8 G, 1.8 V and 1.8 Hybrid paired with CVT. All-around disc brakes are standard on all models. The hybrid trim is equipped with Toyota Safety Sense.

On 8 February 2022, the G trim was dropped from the lineup, leaving only the V and Hybrid trim levels. The Hybrid trim gained a wireless charger and updated Toyota Safety Sense, which consisting all-speed Dynamic Radar Cruise Control and adds Lane Tracing Assist.

Malaysia 
In Malaysia, the Corolla is offered in 1.8 E and 1.8 G trim levels paired with CVT, with Toyota Safety Sense only available for the latter. Although marketed as "Corolla" only, it retained the "Altis" badge like the rest of other Southeast Asian countries as it is a CBU model imported from Thailand.

Philippines 
In the Philippines, initial trim levels of the Corolla Altis were 1.6 E (with manual transmission only), 1.6 G (with either manual transmission or CVT), 1.6 V (with CVT only) and 1.8 V Hybrid (with eCVT only). In November 2021, the Corolla Altis gained an 8-inch infotainment system with Apple CarPlay and Android Auto as standard for the V and Hybrid trims, while the manual transmission option was dropped for the G trim. In April 2022, the GR Sport variant, based on the 1.6 V model was launched.

Singapore 
The Corolla Altis made its official debut during the Singapore Motorshow on 9 January 2020; in Standard and Elegance trim levels with 1.6 liter Dual VVT-i gasoline engine, and a Hybrid model with 1.8 liter engine. All models have CVT gearbox. Toyota Safety Sense is only for the Elegance and Hybrid models.

Thailand 
Thailand was the first country in Southeast Asia to launch the E210 series Corolla Altis. Based on the 1.6 J, the cheapest model of the Thai market Corolla Altis is called Limo, which is intended for taxi purpose. The other trim levels are 1.6 G, 1.8 GR Sport, Hybrid Entry, Hybrid Mid and Hybrid High. All engines are paired with CVT. Toyota Safety Sense was exclusive to Hybrid High trim. In January 2021, the Hybrid trim levels Entry, Mid and High were changed to Hybrid Smart, Hybrid Premium and Hybrid Premium Safety respectively and the 1.8 Sport trim was also introduced. In January 2022, the Limo and Hybrid Smart trims were discontinued and Hybrid Premium Safety trim was replaced by Hybrid GR Sport.

Vietnam 
In Vietnam, the E210 Corolla Altis was released on 9 March 2022 and is offered in 1.8 G, 1.8 V and 1.8 HV grade levels. Unlike the previous generation, it is imported from Thailand instead of being locally assembled.

Australia 

The Corolla Hatchback was launched in Australia on 7 August 2018, while the Corolla saloon went on sale on 26 November 2019. Both the hatchback and saloon are available in three trim levels: Ascent Sport, SX and ZR. All variants are powered by a 2.0-litre engine. The 6-speed manual transmission is only available as standard on the base model Ascent Sport, while automatic CVT is optional for the Ascent Sport and standard on the mid-level SX and top-of-the-line ZR. The 1.8-litre engine with hybrid drivetrain is also available for all trim levels except the ZR trim of the Corolla saloon.

All the Australian Corolla hatchbacks and saloons come with seven SRS Airbags, Lane Departure Alert, Vehicle Stability Control (VSC), Traction Control, Hill-start Assist Control and Active Cornering Assist. The base model with manual transmission is equipped with High-speed Active Cruise Control, while all the CVT models have All-speed Active Cruise Control. The SX and ZR have dual zone air-conditioning and wireless phone charger. The ZR comes with standard heated front sports front bucket seats, intelligent ambient illumination, auto-dimming rear view mirror, eight-speaker JBL audio system and 18-inch alloy wheels.

New Zealand 
The Corolla Hatchback is available in GX, SX and ZR trims with options for petrol or hybrid models for each. The petrol and Hybrid models all share the same engine for each of their respective power plants. All are equipped with CVT transmission.

South Africa 
The E210 Corolla Hatchback has been available in South Africa since February 2019 in two trim levels: XS and XR. Both are powered by a 1.2-litre 8NR-FTS engine. Both the six-speed iMT and CVT are available on the XS trim, while the XR is only offered with CVT.

Sales of the saloon began in March 2020. Both XR trims get a six-speed manual or CVT, while the XS remains available as either a CVT or Hybrid as of September 2021. Unlike the previous generations, the E210 Corolla saloon is no longer manufactured in South Africa, while the older E180 continues to be produced in the country and sold as the Corolla Quest.

Facelift

North America 
In 2022, Toyota Motors North America announced a facelift for the Corolla for the 2023 model year. The base model L is dropped for this year moving all models to include automatic climate control, larger 8-inch touchscreen, remote keyless entry, as well as receiving new exterior styling inspired by the GR Corolla. Additionally the LE model now includes torsion beam rear suspension compared to the formerly multi-link rear suspension that was standard on all Corollas. Under the bonnet, the LE and XLE models received the same powertrain as the previous SE and XSE trims: the 2.0-litre M20A-FKS Dynamic Force inline four-cylinder engine and the K120 Direct Shift continuously variable transmission with a physical first gear. Hybrid models retained the 1.8-litre 2ZR-FXE inline four-cylinder engine mated to Toyota's Hybrid Synergy Drive, but received a more powerful electric motor–generator and a smaller lithium-ion battery that sits under the rear seat increasing luggage space. Hybrid technology, which was previously only available in a single LE trim, will now be offered in SE and XSE trims, and all hybrid trims will be available with four-wheel drive. All trims will have the updated Toyota Safety Sense 3.0 suite of advanced driver-assistance systems and an 8-inch touchscreen with the Toyota Audio Multimedia system capable of Over-the-Air (OTA) updates that debuted on the XK70 series Tundra. The 2023 Corolla lineup went on sale in October 2022.

Europe 
For the facelift in the European market, Toyota will also offer new exterior styling for the Corolla, but will eliminate all non-hybrid powertrains. European market Corollas will also feature the new Toyota Audio Multimedia system, but utilising a 10.5-inch touchscreen, larger than the previous 8-inch screen.

Japan 
For the Japanese market, the facelifted Corolla was launched on 3 October 2022, retaining the saloon, Sport (hatchback) and Touring (estate) configurations. Both the 8NR-FTS and 2ZR-FAE engine options were replaced by newer M15A-FKS engine for the saloon and Touring models, and the M20A-FKS engine for Sport model.

Oceania 
The facelifted Corolla for the Australian market was launched on 8 November 2022. Similar to the pre-facelift model, the grade levels offered are Ascent Sport, SX and ZR with either a 2.0-litre M20A-FKS petrol or a 1.8-litre 2ZR-FXE hybrid petrol engines.

GR Corolla 

The GR Corolla is the high-performance variant of the E210 series Corolla, which is only available in hatchback body style. It is built with assistance from the company's Gazoo Racing (GR) division. It was first introduced on 31 March 2022.

The GR Corolla will be built mainly for the North American market as Europe received the GR Yaris (which is not sold in North America). The GR Corolla will also be sold in Japan, Australia, New Zealand, Brazil and Thailand (limited to nine units).

Safety

Latin NCAP 
The Corolla in its most basic Latin American configuration with 7 airbags received 5 stars for adult occupants, 5 stars for toddlers, and Advanced Award from Latin NCAP in 2019.

ANCAP 
The Corolla Hatchback got a five-star safety rating by the Australasian New Car Assessment Program.
2018 Toyota Corolla (ANCAP):

IIHS 
On 2 October 2018, the Corolla Hatchback received a "Top Safety Pick Award" but not a "Plus" award because of its lack of good-rated headlamps. The same ratings were also received in 2019 for the 2020 model year Corolla saloon.

ASEAN NCAP

References

External links 

  (global)

210
Cars introduced in 2018
2020s cars
Vehicles with CVT transmission
Hybrid electric cars
Partial zero-emissions vehicles
ANCAP small family cars
ASEAN NCAP small family cars
Latin NCAP small family cars
Motor vehicles manufactured in the United States